Heinz Georg Kramm (born 13 December 1938), known professionally as Heino, is a German singer of Schlager and traditional Volksmusik. Having sold a total of over 50 million records, he is one of the most successful German musicians of all time.

Heino is known for his baritone voice and trademark combination of light blond hair and dark sunglasses (which he wears due to exophthalmos). He lives in the town of Bad Münstereifel, where he owned a café until June 2012. His interest in music started when his mother gave him an accordion in 1948, although his family could barely afford it.

Early life
Heino was born on 13 December 1938 in Düsseldorf-Oberbilk, Germany, to Heinrich and Franziska Kramm. His father was a Roman Catholic dentist, his mother a Protestant. His grandfather was the organist at the Cathedral of Cologne. He also had two cousins who were Catholic priests. Heino's father was drafted into the German army during World War II, and was killed on 2 August 1941 during the invasion of the Soviet Union.

Until 1945, Heino lived with his mother and his older sister Hannelore in Pomerania. In 1945 he began school in Großenhain (Saxony). After 1952 he went to Düsseldorf where he initially trained as a baker and confectioner.

Career

His stage name comes from his sister Hannelore's difficulty pronouncing his given name "Heinz Georg".

In 1961, he first appeared in the trio OK Singers. Heino achieved fame in the mid-1960s and has charted numerous times since then in the German music charts. He also appeared regularly in German television shows such as ZDF-Hitparade, Musikantenstadl and ZDF-Fernsehgarten. Most of his recordings were pop versions of traditional folk songs; for example in "Blau blüht der Enzian" ("Blue Blooms the Gentian"), one of his signature songs and an adaptation of the folk song "Das Schweizermädel" ("The Swiss Maiden").

In February 2013, Heino released a new album, called "Mit freundlichen Grüßen" (Yours sincerely), which topped the German album charts. It was the first Number-one-album for him in Germany. The record is a collection of cover versions of popular German songs from Die Ärzte, Peter Fox, Rammstein and others. It is as such a Pop-Rock/Metal-record instead of Heino's typical Schlager and Volksmusik style. The album earned Gold for being sold over 100,000 times.

In December 2014, Heino released a new album, "Schwarz blüht der Enzian" (Black blooms the Gentian), referring to one of his greatest hits "Blau blüht der Enzian" (Blue Blooms the Gentian) and to the Rock-/Metal style of the record in which some of his own songs and traditional German Volksmusik are covered.

In November 2016, Heino announced the release of his new Christmas album, "Mit weihnachtlichen Grüßen" (With Christmas greetings), which includes a duet with fellow singer Sarah Jane Scott.

After a 50-year career, Heino announced on 30 September 2018 his final tour in 2019 and the release of his final album "...und Tschüss, das letzte Album" (...and bye, the final album). The album consists of 36 songs which are mainly his traditional German folk songs which made him famous. However, he later announced a tour for the autumn of 2020 in which he performs classic music.

Personal life

In June 1959 he married 18-year-old Henriette Heppner. They had one son, Uwe, born in 1962, and subsequently divorced. He married his second wife, Lilo Kramm, in 1965; their marriage ended in divorce in 1978. Lilo died of cancer on 28 January 2010.

In 1968, he became the father of an illegitimate daughter named Petra after an affair with a woman named Karin. Petra had schizophrenia, for which she received treatment in."She was trapped in her own world and could no longer participate in normal life." She committed suicide by suffocation in 2003, as her mother had in 1988. 

Heino met his third wife, Hannelore Auersperg, in 1972 at the Miss Austria contest in Kitzbühel. They were married in April 1979, and she became his manager. The couple lives in Bad Münstereifel. In 2004, Hannelore suffered a heart attack, which was one reason Heino curtailed his career.

Heino has noticeable exophthalmos due to Graves' disease. For this reason, he always wears very dark glasses in public, which have become part of his trademark appearance. In a 2014 German newspaper story Heino was quoted as saying that he feels "naked" without them and that he had put in his will that he was to be buried with them on. Due to his light hair and skin, some initially believed he wore the glasses due to albinism.

Select list of songs
 "Jenseits des Tales" (1966)
 "Wenn die bunten Fahnen wehen" (1967)
 "Wir lieben die Stürme" (1968)
 "Zu der Ponderosa reiten wir" (1968)
 "Bergvagabunden" (1969)
 "Bier her, oder ich fall um" (1969)
 "Wenn die Kraniche zieh'n" (1969)
 "Karamba, Karacho, ein Whisky" (1969)
 "In einer Bar in Mexico" (1970)
 "Hey Capello" (1970)
 "Mohikana Shalali" (1971)
 "Blau blüht der Enzian" (1972)
 "Carneval in Rio" (1972)
 "Tampico" (1973)
 "La Montanara" (1973)
 "Edelweiß" (1973)
 "Schwarzbraun ist die Haselnuss"
 "Das Polenmädchen" (1974)
 "Die schwarze Barbara" (1975)
 "Komm in meinen Wigwam" (1976)
 "Bier, Bier, Bier" (1980)
 "Junge" (Die Ärzte cover, 2013)
 "Sonne" (Rammstein cover, 2013)
 "Schwarz Blüht der Enzian" (2014)

References

External links

Heino's official website

1938 births
Living people
Musicians from Düsseldorf
People from the Rhine Province
German pop singers
German male singers
German folk singers
Schlager musicians